is a Japanese tennis player.

Nakagawa has a career high ATP singles ranking of world No, 531 achieved on 24 July 2017. He also has a career high ATP doubles ranking of world No. 726 achieved on 30. July 2018.

As a junior, Nakagawa reached his highest ranking of number 9 in the world in the combined singles and doubles ITF junior ranking system. His junior tenure was highlighted and capped off by winning the boys' doubles title at the 2014 US Open where he alongside Australia's Omar Jasika defeated the Brazilian duo or Joao Menezes and Rafael Matos in straight sets 6–3, 7–6(8–6).

Nakagawa has reached 10 singles finals, with a record of 3 wins and 7 losses. Additionally, he has reached 6 doubles finals with a record of 2 wins and 4 losses. All 16 combined final appearances he has made come at the ITF Futures level.

ATP Challenger and ITF Futures finals

Singles: 10 (3–7)

Doubles: 6 (2–4)

Junior Grand Slam finals

Doubles: 1 (1 title)

External links
 
 

1996 births
Living people
Japanese male tennis players
US Open (tennis) junior champions
People from Fukutsu, Fukuoka
Sportspeople from Fukuoka Prefecture
Sportspeople from Bradenton, Florida
Grand Slam (tennis) champions in boys' doubles
20th-century Japanese people
21st-century Japanese people